is a Japanese former baseball pitcher.

His elder brother Satoshi was also a former professional baseball player.

Biography
Iriki attended the Perfect Liberty High School and Asia University (Japan) before joining the Honda amateur baseball team. He was drafted by the Yomiuri Giants in 1996. In 1999, his older brother, Satoshi, was traded to the Giants from the Kintetsu Buffaloes, and the two were teammates from 1999 to 2000. In 2001, he led the team in wins (13), and appeared in the all-star game for the first time. His brother had also made it to the all-star game, pitching for the Yakult Swallows, and the Iriki brothers made back to back appearances in the all-star game. This was the first all-star sibling relay in Japanese baseball history.

In the 2003 off-season, Iriki was traded to the Hokkaido Nippon-Ham Fighters, and caused some controversy by trying to make the team ensure that he would be released to play in the major leagues in two years. Iriki got his wish in 2006, signing a major league contract with the New York Mets. He did not make it onto the major league roster, and was given a minor league contract in April of the same year. On April 28, 2006, Iriki was suspended for 50 games for violating Major League Baseball's policy against performance-enhancing drug use. The suspension originated from testing during the Mets' spring training camp.

Iriki was dropped by the Mets at the end of 2006, and spent the 2007 season in the Toronto Blue Jays minor league system. He returned to the Japanese leagues in 2008, signing with the Yokohama BayStars. After the season, he announced his retirement from professional baseball.

References

See also
, or Japanese Baseball Players, or Minor League Baseball, or Pelota Binaria (Venezuelan Winter League)

1972 births
Living people
Asia University (Japan) alumni
Baseball players suspended for drug offenses
Dunedin Blue Jays players
Hokkaido Nippon-Ham Fighters players
Japanese baseball coaches
Japanese expatriate baseball players in the United States
Japanese sportspeople in doping cases
New Hampshire Fisher Cats players
Nippon Ham Fighters players
Nippon Professional Baseball coaches
Nippon Professional Baseball pitchers
Norfolk Tides players
Pastora de los Llanos players
Baseball people from Miyazaki Prefecture
St. Lucie Mets players
Syracuse Chiefs players
Yokohama BayStars players
Yomiuri Giants players
Japanese expatriate baseball players in Venezuela